The Pass Red Devils were a Junior A ice hockey team in the Alberta Junior Hockey League that played in the municipality of Crowsnest Pass, Alberta, from 1972 to 1976. The team relocated to nearby Pincher Creek for two years before settling in Calgary as the Calgary Spurs.

Their four-season tenure in Crowsnest Pass was mostly unsuccessful. The Red Devils never finished a season with more wins than losses and still hold the record for the worst full season in terms of wins and points in Alberta Junior Hockey League history with their 3–56–1 record in 1974–75, although the Calgary Cowboys and Drumheller Falcons recorded worse records before folding mid-season. Their 28-game losing streak that season is also still a league record as 2005.

Crowsnest Pass was later represented in the AJHL by the Crowsnest Pass Timberwolves from 1998 to 2004.

Season-by-season records

Note: GP = Games played, W = Wins, L = Losses, T = Ties, Pts = Points, GF = Goals for, GA = Goals against

See also
 List of ice hockey teams in Alberta

References

Defunct Alberta Junior Hockey League teams
Defunct ice hockey teams in Alberta
Defunct junior ice hockey teams in Canada
Ice hockey clubs established in 1972
1972 establishments in Alberta
1976 disestablishments in Alberta
Ice hockey clubs disestablished in 1976